Eastlake is a  "home rule" village in Manistee County  U.S. state of Michigan. The population was 512 at the 2010 census.

Eastlake was incorporated as a village in 1912.

Geography

Demographics

The median income (census 2000) for a household in the village was $131,750, and the median income for a family was $135,417. Males had a median income of $131,250 versus $120,000 for females. The per capita income for the village was $115,034.  About 1.6% of families and 3.4% of the population were below the poverty line, including none of those under age 18 and 9.4% of those age 65 or over.

2010 census
As of the census of 2010, there were 512 people, 231 households, and 147 families residing in the village. The racial makeup of the village was 89.8% White, 0.6% African American, 3.1% Native American, 0.2% Asian, 0.6% from other races, and 5.7% from two or more races. Hispanic or Latino of any race were 2.9% of the population.

There were 231 households, of which 24.2% had children under the age of 18 living with them, 44.6% were married couples living together, 12.6% had a female householder with no husband present, 6.5% had a male householder with no wife present, and 36.4% were non-families. 30.7% of all households were made up of individuals, and 14.3% had someone living alone who was 65 years of age or older. The average household size was 2.22 and the average family size was 2.65.

The median age in the village was 46.8 years. 19.1% of residents were under the age of 18; 5.2% were between the ages of 18 and 24; 23.1% were from 25 to 44; 30.6% were from 45 to 64; and 22.1% were 65 years of age or older. The gender makeup of the village was 47.9% male and 52.1% female.

Climate
This climatic region is typified by large seasonal temperature differences, with warm to hot (and often humid) summers and cold (sometimes severely cold) winters.  According to the Köppen Climate Classification system, Eastlake has a humid continental climate, abbreviated "Dfb" on climate maps.

References

Notes

Sources

Villages in Manistee County, Michigan
Villages in Michigan
1912 establishments in Michigan